Kathleen "Kathy" Matthews is an American biochemist specializing in DNA/protein interactions. She is the Stewart Memorial Professor of BioSciences at Rice University.

Career
Matthews is Stewart Memorial Professor in BioSciences at Rice University and a founding member of the Biochemistry department, which later merged to become the BioSciences department. She received a B.S. in chemistry from the University of Texas at Austin in 1966 and went on to get her PhD in biochemistry from the University of California, Berkeley in 1970. After working as a postdoctoral fellow at Stanford university, she joined the faculty at Rice as an assistant professor in Biochemistry 1977 before becoming department chair and the dean of the Wiess School of Natural Sciences 1987 and 1998, respectively.

Research
Matthews's research focuses on the interactions of protein and DNA, in particular LacI and the Hox gene protein Ultrabithorax. She has written over 160 papers.

Awards
In 1996 she was elected a fellow of the American Association for the Advancement of Science. In 2010, Matthews was honored as a Women in Science with Excellence honoree for her role in the Biochemistry department at Rice. She received the William C. Rose Award in 2015 for her work in DNA-binding proteins and her commitment to mentoring young scientists.

Selected publications

References

External links
 Faculty website

American women biochemists
Year of birth missing (living people)
Living people
Rice University faculty
University of Texas at Austin College of Natural Sciences alumni
UC Berkeley College of Letters and Science alumni
American women academics
21st-century American women scientists